Deepti Daryanani is an actress, singer and dancer who plays the role of Gita on the Disney Channel Original Movie titled The Cheetah Girls: One World. She also played Maya in the Lifetime movie Acceptance. She was also cast in Yeh Kya Ho Raha Hai? Bollywood remake of the hit American movie American Pie.

External links

Living people
Year of birth missing (living people)
Place of birth missing (living people)
American television actresses
American women singers of Indian descent